Dărmănești is a commune in Dâmbovița County, Muntenia, Romania with a population of 7,852 people. The commune is located in southern Romania. It is composed of two villages, Dărmănești and Mărginenii de Sus. It also included Vlădeni village until 2003, when it was split off to form a separate commune.

References

Communes in Dâmbovița County
Localities in Muntenia